The gates of Sfax are the entrances into the Medina quarter of Sfax, Tunisia.

History 
Until the 20th century, the medina of Sfax had only two entrances: Bab Diwan in the southern facade, and Bab Jebli in the northern one. During the 20th century, many new gates were built in order to decongest the medina and promote the exchange with the external areas.

List of the gates 
 Bab Diwan
 Bab Jebli
 Bab Jebli Jedid
 Bab El Ksar
 Bab El Kasbah
 Bab Nahj El Bey
 Bab Borj Ennar
 Bab Charki
 Bab Gharbi

Gallery

References